The 2024 North Dakota gubernatorial election will be held on November 5, 2024, to elect the governor of North Dakota, concurrently with the U.S. presidential election, as well as various other federal, state, and local elections. As North Dakota did not have gubernatorial term limits in its constitution until 2023, incumbent Republican Governor Doug Burgum has yet to say whether he will seek re-election to a third term in office. In November 2022, voters in the state approved a constitutional amendment limiting governors to two four-year terms, but it only applies to individuals elected after January 1, 2023, so Burgum is still eligible to run for re-election under a grandfather clause. If Burgum runs for and wins a third term, he will be the last North Dakota governor to serve more than two terms; otherwise, John Hoeven will have been the last to serve more than two terms and William L. Guy will have been the last to serve three full terms.

Republican primary

Candidates

Publicly expressed interest
Doug Burgum, incumbent governor

General election

Predictions

Notes

References

2024
Governor
North Dakota